Roll is a community located in Roger Mills County, Oklahoma, United States. The community is on U.S. Highway 283 at the junction with State Highway 47. Cheyenne lies approximately 11 miles to the south along Route 283. The Canadian River is about six miles to the north.

Founded in old Day County, the post office was opened December 9, 1903. It closed August 31, 1920.

References

 Shirk, George H. Oklahoma Place Names. Norman: University of Oklahoma Press, 1987.  .

External links
 History, picture and maps

Unincorporated communities in Roger Mills County, Oklahoma
Unincorporated communities in Oklahoma